The Atlantic 10 Conference Men's Soccer Player of the Year are a series of three awards given out at the end of the college soccer season. Currently, the Atlantic-10 Conference gives out awards for the best offensive, defensive and midfielder of the year.

Notable winners of the award include Alexi Lalas, Peter Vermes and Geoff Cameron.

Key

Winners

Player of the Year (1987–1999)

Offensive Player of the Year (2000–)

Defensive Player of the Year (2000–)

Midfielder of the Year (2007–)

References 

College soccer trophies and awards in the United States
Atlantic 10
Player of the Year
Awards established in 1987
1987 establishments in the United States